Kerala school may refer to:

Kerala School Kalolsavam, an annual art competition for students in Kerala
Kerala school of astronomy and mathematics, in Kerala between the 14th and 16th centuries CE
Kerala School of Mathematics, Kozhikode, in Kunnamangalam near Kozhikode City